Diara railway station is a Kolkata Suburban Railway station on the Sheoraphuli–Tarakeswar branch line of Howrah railway division of the Eastern Railway zone. It is situated beside State Highway 2 at Diara in Hooghly district in the Indian state of West Bengal.

History 
The Sheoraphuli–Tarakeswar branch line was opened by the Tarkessur Railway Company on 1 January 1885 and was worked by East Indian Railway Company. The Tarkessur company was taken over by the East Indian Railway in 1915. The track was first electrified with 3,000 V DC system in 1957–58. In 1967, this line including Diara railway station was electrified with to 25 kV AC system.

References 

Railway stations in Hooghly district
Howrah railway division
Kolkata Suburban Railway stations